College Stadium was the stadium for the East Carolina Pirates football team.  It was built in 1949 for $25,000.  The facility sat 2,000 spectators.  The complex was razed in 1962 once Ficklen Memorial Stadium was built.  It replaced Guy Smith Stadium as the primary football field.

History 
In November 1948, President Messick and boosters of the school met to discuss building a stadium on campus.  Boosters at that meeting pledged $8,000 that night.  It was decided $25,000 was needed to construct the complex.  After a fund raising drive, $25,730 was raised from 1,500 individuals and 227 businesses.  It was dedicated on September 21, 1949.  The Pirates beat Cherry Point in the first game 24–0.  It was located on the east side of the Main Campus approximately where the Brewster Building is today.

References 

Defunct college football venues
East Carolina Pirates football
American football venues in North Carolina
Sports venues in Pitt County, North Carolina
1949 establishments in North Carolina
Sports venues completed in 1949
1962 disestablishments in North Carolina
Sports venues demolished in 1962